Jane Caplan is an academic and historian specialising in Nazi Germany and the history of the documentation of individual identity. She is currently Visiting Professor at Birkbeck, University of London, Visiting Professor of History at Gresham College and Emeritus Fellow at St. Antony's College, University of Oxford.

Education and career
Caplan received her undergraduate and postgraduate degrees from Somerville College, Oxford during the 1960s/70s. After receiving her doctorate in 1974, she taught at Cambridge University, where she worked as a research assistant to Arnold J. Toynbee. While at Cambridge, Caplan helped establish one of Britain's first courses in Women's Studies.

Caplan relocated to the United States, where she became Visiting Assistant Professor at Columbia University in New York. She then moved to Bryn Mawr College in Pennsylvania, to become the Marjorie Walter Goodhart Professor of European History, a position she held until 2004.

In 2004 she returned to the UK to become a member of the History Department at the University of Oxford. She is currently a Visiting Professor at Birkbeck, University of London.

In 2011, Caplan became Visiting Fellow at the Max Planck Institute for the History of Science.

In addition to her position at Birkbeck, Caplan was appointed Visiting Professor of History for the 2013/2014 academic year at Gresham College. There she delivered a series of free public lectures in June 2014 collectively entitled "How do I know who you are? The History of Identity in Britain and Europe", following her research on individual identity.

Academic interests
Caplan regards her main research field to be Nazi Germany and most of her publications have been on this period of history. She also holds an academic interest in the history of women, sexuality and the history of individual identity and identity documents. She is currently working on the administration of identification in Nazi Germany, especially civil registration.

She has been a member of many editorial boards. She is one of the founding editors of Signum – The International Society for Mark Studies and she currently sits on the advisory board for German History, H-Net German, International Labor and Working Class History and L’Homme: Zeitschrift fur feministische Geschichtswissenschaft. She has also been Editor of History Workshop Journal and sat on the editorial board for American Historical Review, German History and Journal of Modern History.

In 2008, Caplan set up IdentiNet with Dr Edward Higgs from University of Essex. The aim is 'Documenting Individual Identity: Historical and Comparative Perspectives since 1500'. IdentiNet describes themselves as a 'network of academics from four continents, working to tell the story of individual identification within a long-term, international and comparative framework'. IdentiNet was supported by an International Networks grant from the Leverhulme Trust to the University of Oxford's Faculty of History.

Publications

 A Study of History:  A New Edition, Revised and Abridged with Arnold J. Toynbee (Oxford University Press, 1972).  (Toynbee notes in the Foreword that "the captions to the illustrations have been drafted by Miss Caplan and approved by me" [p. 12].)

Nazi Germany

 Gabriele Herz, The Women's Camp in Moringen. A Memoir of Imprisonment in Germany 1936-1937 (New York/Oxford Berghahn Books 2006) 
 Nazi Germany (Oxford University Press, 2008) 
 Concentration Camps in Nazi Germany. The New Histories with Nikolaus Wachsmann (Routledge, 2010)

History of individual identity and identity documents

 Written on the Body: The Tattoo in European and American History (London/Princeton: Princeton University Press, 2000)
 Documenting Individual Identity: The Development of State Practises in the Modern World with John Torepy (Princeton: Princeton University Press, 2011)

References

External links
IdentiNet website
Gresham College page for Jane Caplan
Signum, The International Society for Mark Studies website

Professors of Gresham College
20th-century British historians
21st-century British historians
Columbia University faculty
Bryn Mawr College faculty
Historians of Europe
Fellows of St Antony's College, Oxford
Alumni of Somerville College, Oxford
Academics of Birkbeck, University of London
Living people
British women historians
21st-century British women writers
20th-century British women writers
1945 births